Lail may refer to the following people:

Brady Lail, American baseball player
Elizabeth Lail (born 1992), American actress
Leah Lail, American actress and real estate agent
Muedzul Lail Tan Kiram (born 1966), head of the Royal House of Sulu, Philippines

See also
Al-Lail
Lehal